The Westland by-election was a by-election in the New Zealand electorate of Westland, a semi-urban seat at the west coast of the South Island.

The by-election was held on 13 July 1906, and was precipitated by the death of sitting MP, Prime Minister Richard Seddon. The seat was won by his son, Thomas. His sole opponent was Henry Michel, former Mayor of Hokitika.

Results
The following table gives the election results:

References

Westland 1906
1906 elections in New Zealand
Politics of the West Coast, New Zealand